Nartheciaceae is a family of flowering plants. The APG III system places it in the order Dioscoreales, in the clade monocots. As circumscribed by APG IV (2016) it includes 35 species of herbaceous plants in the following five genera:

 Aletris
 Lophiola
 Metanarthecium
 Narthecium
 Nietneria

References

External links
 
 Aletris in the Flora of North America en in the Flora of China
 Aletris farinosa: pictures, description
 Lophiola in the Flora of North America and at the USDA
 Narthecium in the Flora of North America
 NCBI Taxonomy Browser
 links at CSDL, Texas
Angiosperm Phylogeny Website

 
Monocot families